Ludvig Hope Faye (4 March 1931 – 1 June 2017) was a Norwegian politician for the Conservative Party.

He served as a deputy representative to the Norwegian Parliament from Vest-Agder during the term 1977–1981.

He was the mayor of Mandal municipality from 1972 to 1975. Following the 1987 elections, Faye became the new county mayor (fylkesordfører) of Vest-Agder. In 1995 he was succeeded by Christian Democrat Kjell Svindland.

References

1931 births
2017 deaths
Deputy members of the Storting
Conservative Party (Norway) politicians
Chairmen of County Councils of Norway
Mayors of places in Vest-Agder
People from Mandal, Norway